Onycholabis is a genus of ground beetles in the family Carabidae. There are about seven described species in Onycholabis.

Species
These seven species belong to the genus Onycholabis:
 Onycholabis acutangulus Andrewes, 1923  (China and India)
 Onycholabis arrowi Jedlicka, 1935  (Philippines)
 Onycholabis melitopus Bates, 1892  (worldwide)
 Onycholabis nakanei Kasahara, 1986  (Japan)
 Onycholabis pendulangulus Liang & Imura, 2003  (China, Laos, and Vietnam)
 Onycholabis sinensis Bates, 1873  (China, South Korea, Taiwan, Vietnam, and temperate Asia)
 Onycholabis stenothorax Liang & Kavanaugh, 2005  (China)

References

Platyninae